Mecaphesa is a genus of crab spiders that was first described by Eugène Louis Simon in 1900.

Species
 it contains forty-nine species and one subspecies, found in North America, Central America, the Caribbean, South America, and on Hawaii:
Mecaphesa aikoae (Schick, 1965) – USA
Mecaphesa anguliventris (Simon, 1900) – Hawaii
Mecaphesa arida (Suman, 1971) – Hawaii
Mecaphesa asperata (Hentz, 1847) – North, Central America, Caribbean
Mecaphesa baltea (Suman, 1971) – Hawaii
Mecaphesa bubulcus (Suman, 1971) – Puerto Rico
Mecaphesa californica (Banks, 1896) – USA, Mexico, Hispaniola
Mecaphesa carletonica (Dondale & Redner, 1976) – USA, Canada
Mecaphesa cavata (Suman, 1971) – Hawaii
Mecaphesa celer (Hentz, 1847) – North, Central America
Mecaphesa cincta Simon, 1900 (type) – Hawaii
Mecaphesa coloradensis (Gertsch, 1933) – USA, Mexico
Mecaphesa damnosa (Keyserling, 1880) – Mexico, Guatemala, Panama
Mecaphesa decora (Banks, 1898) – Mexico, Guatemala
Mecaphesa deserti (Schick, 1965) – USA, Mexico
Mecaphesa devia (Gertsch, 1939) – USA
Mecaphesa discreta (Suman, 1971) – Hawaii
Mecaphesa dubia (Keyserling, 1880) – USA, Mexico
Mecaphesa edita (Suman, 1971) – Hawaii
Mecaphesa facunda (Suman, 1971) – Hawaii
Mecaphesa gabrielensis (Schick, 1965) – USA
Mecaphesa gertschi (Kraus, 1955) – El Salvador
Mecaphesa hiatus (Suman, 1971) – Hawaii
Mecaphesa imbricata (Suman, 1971) – Hawaii
Mecaphesa importuna (Keyserling, 1881) – USA
Mecaphesa i. belkini (Schick, 1965) – USA
Mecaphesa inclusa (Banks, 1902) – Ecuador (Galapagos Is.)
Mecaphesa insulana (Keyserling, 1890) – Hawaii
Mecaphesa juncta (Suman, 1971) – Hawaii
Mecaphesa kanakana (Karsch, 1880) – Hawaii
Mecaphesa lepida (Thorell, 1877) – USA, Canada
Mecaphesa lowriei (Schick, 1970) – USA
Mecaphesa naevigera (Simon, 1900) – Hawaii
Mecaphesa nigrofrenata (Simon, 1900) – Hawaii
Mecaphesa oreades (Simon, 1900) – Hawaii
Mecaphesa perkinsi Simon, 1904 – Hawaii
Mecaphesa persimilis (Kraus, 1955) – El Salvador
Mecaphesa prosper (O. Pickard-Cambridge, 1896) – Guatemala
Mecaphesa quercina (Schick, 1965) – USA
Mecaphesa reddelli Baert, 2013 – Ecuador (Galapagos Is.)
Mecaphesa revillagigedoensis (Jiménez, 1991) – Mexico
Mecaphesa rothi (Schick, 1965) – USA
Mecaphesa rufithorax (Simon, 1904) – Hawaii
Mecaphesa schlingeri (Schick, 1965) – USA
Mecaphesa semispinosa Simon, 1900 – Hawaii
Mecaphesa sierrensis (Schick, 1965) – USA
Mecaphesa sjostedti (Berland, 1924) – Chile (Juan Fernandez Is.)
Mecaphesa spiralis (F. O. Pickard-Cambridge, 1900) – Guatemala
Mecaphesa velata (Simon, 1900) – Hawaii
Mecaphesa verityi (Schick, 1965) – USA

See also
 List of Thomisidae species

References

Araneomorphae genera
Spiders of Hawaii
Spiders of North America
Thomisidae